Maribor railway station is the main railway station in Maribor, the second largest city in Slovenia. It was erected in 1844. It was upgraded in 2021.

External links 
Official site of the Slovenian railways 

Buildings and structures in Maribor
Railway stations in Slovenia
Railway stations opened in 1844

Railway stations in Slovenia opened in 1844